= Rooberg =

Bay on Jan Mayen, Norway

Coordinates: 70°55.3′N 8°53.9′W

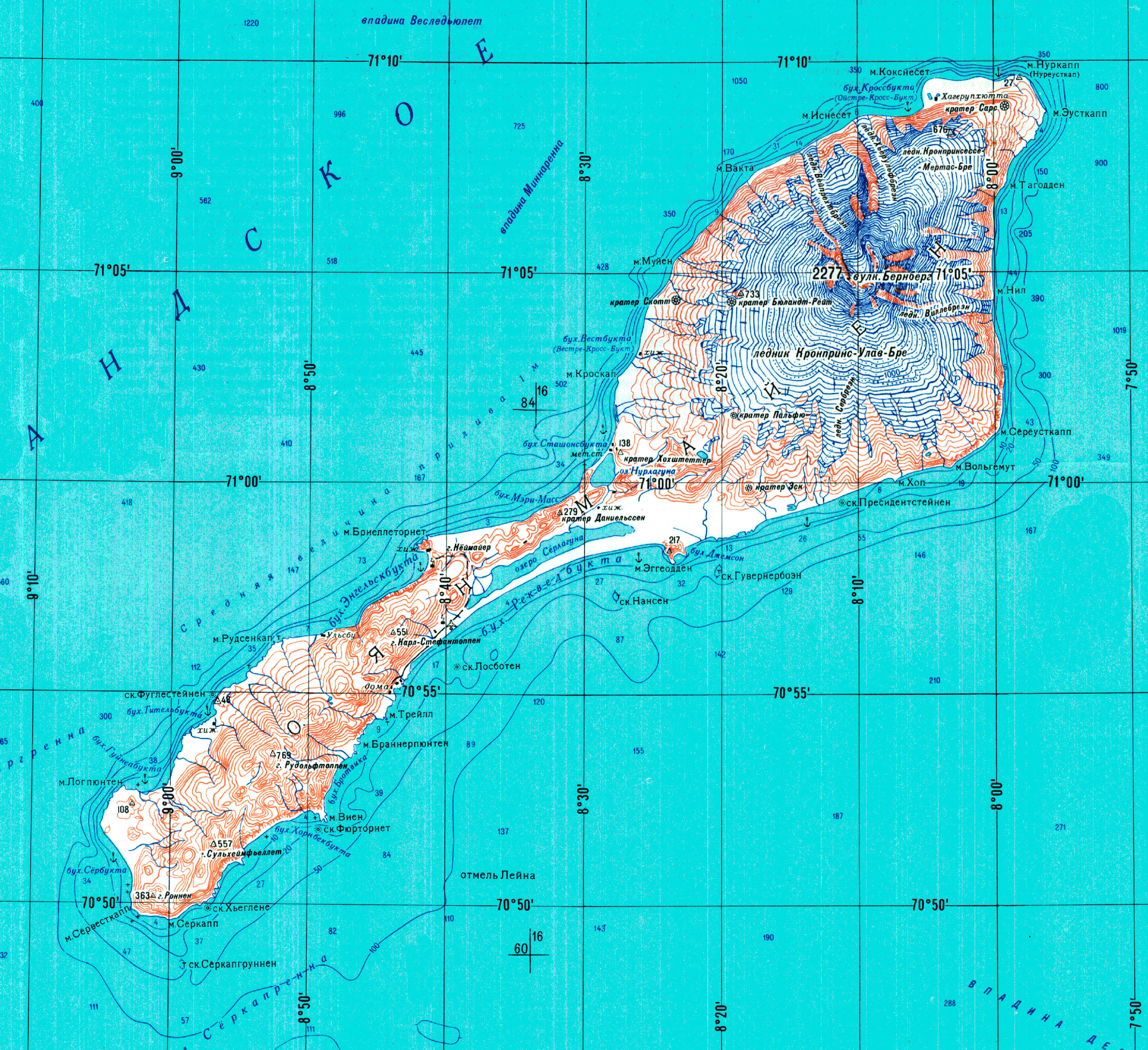
Topographic map of Jan Mayen

Rooberg (English: Red Mountain) is a 50 m (165 ft) hill at Sjuhollendarbukta, a bay on the northwestern coast of the island of Jan Mayen. The hill is often mentioned during the Dutch wintering at Jan Mayen in 1633–34.
