= Sjuhollendarbukta =

Bay on the Norwegian island of Jan Mayen

Coordinates: 70°55.3′N 8°54.5′W

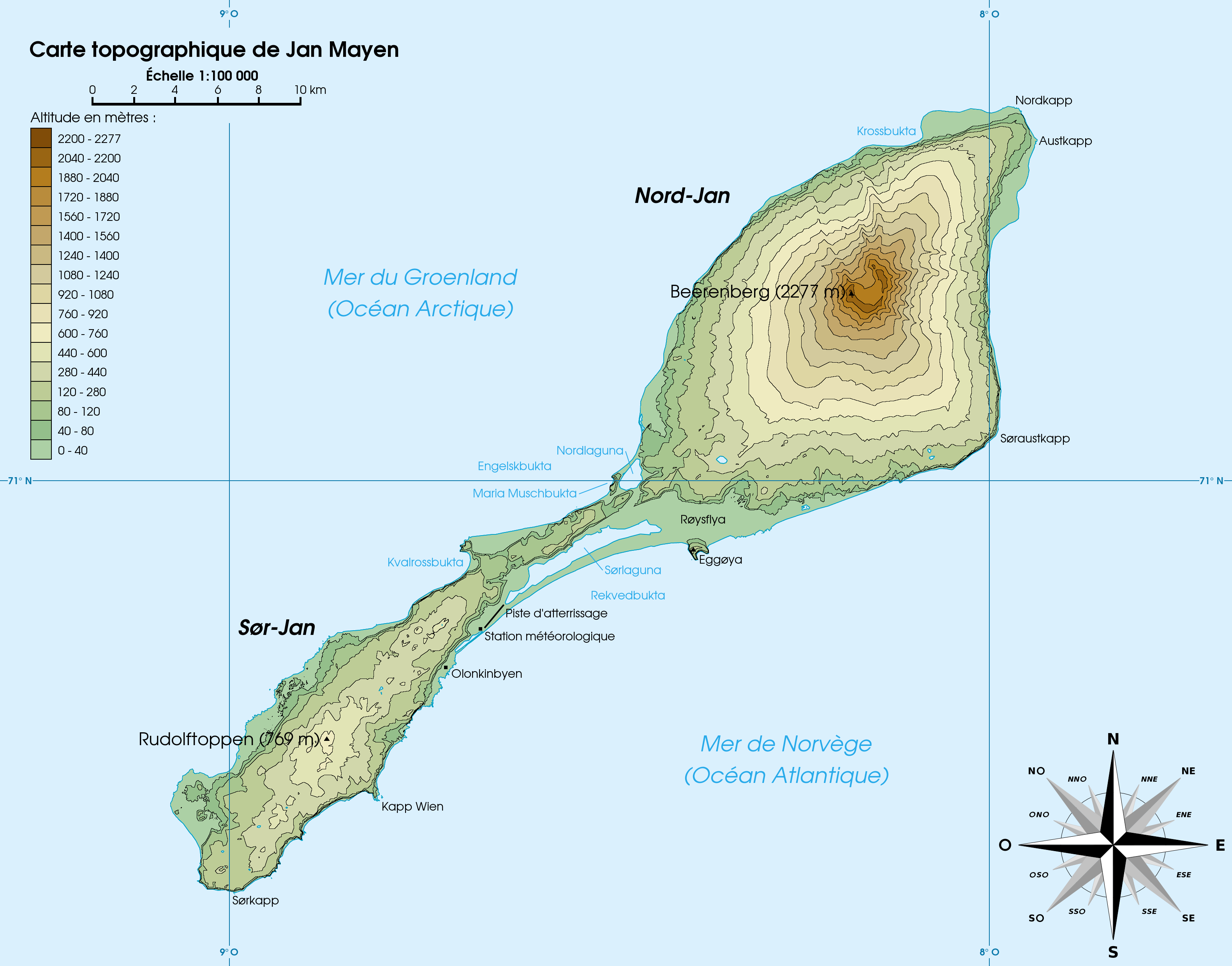
Map of Jan Mayen

Sjuhollendarbukta (English: Seven Hollander Bay) is a bay on the western coast of the island of Jan Mayen. The Austrian Emil von Wohlgemuth (1886), who surveyed Jan Mayen, named the bay 7 Holländer Bucht, mistakenly believing it was the site of the wintering of seven Dutch whalers in 1633–34.
